The 1996 Cork Senior Hurling Championship was the 108th staging of the Cork Senior Hurling Championship since its establishment by the Cork County Board in 1887. The draw for the opening fixtures took place on 10 December 1995. The championship began on 2 June 1996 and ended on 6 October 1996.

Na Piarsaigh entered the championship as the defending champions, however, they were defeated by Imokilly at the semi-final stage.

On 6 October 1996, Avondhu won the championship following a 0-13 to 1-08 defeat of Imokilly in a replay of the final. This was their third championship title overall and their first in 30 championship seasons.

Imokilly's Jimmy Smiddy was the championship's top scorer with 3-38.

Team changes

To Championship

Promoted from the Cork Intermediate Hurling Championship
 Kilbrittain

Results

First round

Second round

Quarter-finals

Semi-finals

Final

Championship statistics

Top scorers

Overall

In a single game

Miscellaneous

 The final was the first to feature two divisional teams.
 Avondhu win the title for the first time since 1966
 Imokilly qualify for the final for the first time since 1968

References

Cork Senior Hurling Championship
Cork Senior Hurling Championship